Monsignor is an honorific form of address or title for certain male clergy members, usually members of the Roman Catholic Church. Monsignor is the apocopic form of the Italian monsignore, meaning "my lord". "Monsignor" can be abbreviated as Mons or Msgr. In some countries, the title "monsignor" is used as a form of address for bishops. However, in English-speaking countries, the title is dropped when a priest is appointed as bishop.

The title "monsignor" is a form of address, not an appointment (such as a bishop or cardinal). A priest cannot be "made a monsignor" or become "the monsignor of a parish". The title "Monsignor" is normally used by clergy  who have received one of the three classes of papal honors:

 Protonotary apostolic (the highest honored class)
 Honorary prelate
 Chaplain of his holiness (the lowest honored class)

The pope bestows these papal honors upon clergy who:

 Have rendered a valuable service to the church
 Provide some special function in church governance
 Are members of bodies such as certain chapters

Clerics working in the Roman Curia and the Vatican diplomatic service are eligible for all three honors.  Priests working in a diocese are only eligible for the "chaplain of his holiness" honor. Priests must be nominated by their bishop and must be at least 65 years old.

Current honor rules

Current honor classes 
Pope Paul VI, in his 1968 publication motu proprio Pontificalis Domus, reduced the number of papal honors from 14 to three. The protonotary apostolic class was divided into two subsections.  The classes of chamberlains and chaplains were abolished, leaving only a single class of "chaplains of his holiness". The three papal honor classes are:
 Protonotary apostolic (two subclasses):
 De numero (the higher and less common form)
 Supernumerary (the highest grade of monsignor found outside the Vatican)
 Prelate of Honour of His Holiness (formerly the "domestic prelate")
 Chaplain of His Holiness (formerly the "supernumerary privy chamberlain")

Current honor eligibility 
In March 2013, Pope Francis suspended the granting of papal honors, with the title of monsignor, to all clergy except members of the Vatican diplomatic service.

At the October 2013 meeting of the Council of Cardinal Advisers, Pope Francis stated his desire to scale back the honors as part of a broader effort to project a more modest and pastoral vision of leadership. As archbishop of Buenos Aires, Pope Francis never requested papal honors for his priests, associating the honors with clerical "careerism".

In December 2013, Pope Francis decreed that diocesan priests could only receive "chaplain of his holiness", the lowest of the three papal honors.  He also set a minimum age required of 65. Existing honors were not affected. Pope Francis decided to continue papal honors from all three classes for two groups of clergy:

 Officials of the Roman Curia
 Members of the diplomatic service.

Current forms of address 

These are the current forms of address for a monsignor:

 The written form is Monsignor (first name) (last name) or The Reverend Monsignor (first name) (last name).   For example, "Monsignor Bob Smith" or "The Reverend Monsignor Bob Smith".
 The spoken form is Monsignor (last name). For example, "Monsignor Smith".

In English speaking countries, bishops and archbishops are not called "monsignor." However, in 1969 the Vatican Secretariat of State indicated that bishops may be addressed as "monsignor."  In some countries, the titles "Monsignore", "Monseigneur", "Monsenyor",  and "Monseñor" are used for bishops, archbishops and any other prelates below the rank of cardinal or patriarch.

The 1969 instruction also indicated that for bishops "Reverendissimus" (translated as "most reverend") could be added to the word "monsignor".  For example, the "Most Reverend Monsignor John Doe".  This instruction also applied to:

 Prelates without episcopal rank who head offices of the Roman Curia 
 Judges of the Rota 
 The promotor general of justice and the defender of the bond of the Apostolic Signatura
 Protonotaries apostolic "de numero" 
 The four clerics of the camera.

Current ecclesiastical dress 

In 1979, the Vatican simplified the dress of monsignors:

Chaplains of his holiness 
Purple-trimmed black cassocks with purple sashes, good for all occasions.

Honorary prelates 
Red-trimmed black cassocks with purple sashes, good for all occasions. Purple cassocks as choir dress for liturgical events of special solemnity.

Supernumerary protonotaries apostolics 
Red-trimmed black cassocks with purple sashes. Purple cassocks as choir dress.  Can also wear the purple ferraiuolo, a silk cape.  The ferraiuolo is for non-liturgical events, such as graduation and commencement ceremonies.

Protonotaries apostolics de numero 
Red-trimmed black cassocks with purple sashes and the purple ferraiuolo. Purple cassocks as choir dress.  They can wear the mantelletta in choir dress with a black biretta with a red tuft.

Previous honor rules

Previous honor classes 
The Catholic church originally maintained 14 classes of papal honors.  A priest with the title of "privy chamberlain" would lose the title when the pope who granted it died. When the pope abolished the privy chamberlain class in 1968, the rule was abolished also.  These 14 previous classes included:

 Domestic prelates 
 Four kinds of protonotaries apostolic, 
 Four kinds of papal chamberlains, and at least 
 Five types of papal chaplains.
The 14 honor categories were reduced to three categories in 1969.

Previous age requirements 
Under Pope Paul VI, the Secretariat of State set minimum qualifications of age and priesthood for the three papal honor classes:

 Chaplains of his holiness – minimum age 35 and 10 years as priest
 Honorary prelates – minimum age 45 and 15 years as priest
 Protonotaries apostolic supernumerary – minimum age 55 and 20 years as priest

The Secretariat waived the minimum age limit for vicars general proposed for appointment as honorary prelates.  The reasoning was that as long as a priest holds the office of vicar general, he is also protonotary apostolic supernumerary. A vicar general could not be named chaplain of his holiness. All these criteria were superseded in 2013.

Previous forms of address 
 Priests with the title "Chaplain of His Holiness" were formerly addressed in English as "The Very Reverend Monsignor". 
 Priests with the titles "Protonotary Apostolic" or honorary prelate were addressed as "The Right Reverend Monsignor".

These forms were changed in 1969.

Other monsignors
Under the legislation of Pope Pius X, vicars general and vicars capitular (now called diocesan administrators) are titular (not actual) Protonotaries durante munere.  As long as these priests hold the office, they can have the title "monsignor". Vicar generals and diocesan administrators were allowed to wear:

 A black, silk-fringed sash (fascia), 
 Black piping on the biretta with a black tuft 
 A black mantelletta

As a result of this they were in some countries referred to as "black protonotaries". However, Pontificalis domus of Paul VI removed this position (titular protonotaries) from the Papal Household, even though the title of "monsignor", which is to be distinguished from a prelatial rank, has not been withdrawn from vicars general, as can be seen, for instance, from the placing of the abbreviated title "Mons." before the name of every member of the secular (diocesan) clergy listed as a vicar general in the Annuario Pontificio.

See also
 Archpriest
 Catholic Church hierarchy
 Milord

Notes

References

Bibliography
 
 
 
 
 
  Latin text of the Instruction, with an unofficial English translation.
 
 , Italian
 , Italian

Major orders in the Catholic Church
Honorary titles of the Holy See
Italian words and phrases
Catholic ecclesiastical titles
Ecclesiastical styles